Michael McFarland (born August 22, 1985), better known by his stage name Mike Bleed Da BlockStarr or simply Mike Bleed, is an American rapper, songwriter, and actor from New Orleans, Louisiana.

Career
Michael started his musical career recording under the pseudonym Camaro Callione, in 1999. Under the mentorship & guidance of the late Walter McCallon(Tre-8), who gave him his first opportunity to become a household name by letting him perform the chorus on McCallon's Toss It Up record from the 2 Hot 4 TV EP. Michael later changed his stage name to Michael Carlione, a nickname given to him by one of his father's friends. In 2008, Michael was first exposed to the major stage as a solo artist with his debut single  which ultimately gained him a featured performance on BET's 106 & Park's Wild Out Wednesday, and a record deal offer from Universal Republic. The single's video went on to being featured on MTV 2 and many other video shows & outlets. He has had many major company offerings, with a Distribution Deal from Federal Distribution, a former subsidiary of Universal Music Group, being the last.

After a four-year hiatus from the music industry, Michael changed his stage name for the final time to Mike Bleed Da BlockStarr, to better correspond with his self-titled musical genre HipRock & RnBleed. His recent musical popularity came in with his New Orleans Saints based theme song Dats My Team, originally released in 2012. In recent years, Michael has also started tapping into becoming a professional Actor being featured in a couple movies. He was cast in the short Entrepreneurs as Lucien Jenkins, and the Box Office film When the Game Stands Tall with the role of Cam's Cousin.

As of recent, Mike Bleed has released a number of singles. Including such titles as Burn Out, "Losing It", and I Keep A Bag, under his own independent Record Label "BlockStarr Incorporated". In 2015, he became a voting member with the Recording Academy. He's currently working on his forthcoming two part studio album Own My Own; The Alter Ego Prequel, released August 2016, and  Alter Ego: The Fallen Of Michael Carlione; set to release March 2020.

Personal life

During a divorce battle in 2009, after making an unconscious decision to walk away from the music industry for a while, things seemed to all fall down hill at once. On Christmas day of 2010, he was hit with the loss of industry mom and publicist Chiq “Diva” Simms to a brain aneurysm. Suffering from deep depression, he then finds himself in a battle with suicidal ideations, along with drug and alcohol abuse. Attempting a return to the music industry in 2013 after a four year hiatus; his come back is followed by the loss of fellow music partner and best friend Scott “S. Jay” Jackson due to a battle with pancreatic cancer. Only three months after the loss of S. Jay, he was face to face with death himself as a severe car accident would leave him with a multiple fractured spine, collapsed lung, and four broken ribs among other injuries. Only six months after his accident he suffers the first of two heart attacks. Which would only be three months apart from each other.

Discography

Singles

Albums

Music videos

As lead artist

References

1982 births
Living people
African-American male rappers
American male rappers
Rappers from New Orleans
Southern hip hop musicians
21st-century American rappers
21st-century American male musicians
21st-century African-American musicians
20th-century African-American people